The area of Chicoral is located in the southernmost part of the township of Bitaco and within the municipality of La Cumbre in the Valle del Cauca Department of Colombia. It is home to the Hindú Tea Plantation, a major part of the Bitaco River Forest Reserve, and many small estates and farms.

The Bitaco River Forest Reserve was created in 1985 to protect a sizable portion of cloud forest and the headwaters of the Bitaco River, which flows northwest and drains into the Dagua River. The reserve is located on the west slope of the West Andes.   

This is an area of high biodiversity with a high number of bird species including the endemic and highly sought after multicolored tanager.  Other important avian species include sickle-winged guan, scaled fruiteater, golden-winged manakin and purplish-mantled tanager.  In 2008 there was a sighting of cloud-forest pygmy owl, a rare and vulnerable species of the northern Andes.

References

Populated places in the Valle del Cauca Department